The rain forest shrew (Sylvisorex pluvialis) is a species of mammal in the family Soricidae endemic to Cameroon. Its natural habitat is subtropical or tropical moist lowland forest. It is known only from its type locality, and from Kongana, Central African Republic.

The Type locality of the species is the Ikenge Research Station in Cameroon at  elevation.

References

Sylvisorex
Mammals of Cameroon
Endemic fauna of Cameroon
Taxonomy articles created by Polbot
Mammals described in 1996